Anarky is a fictional character in the DC Universe.

Anarky may also refer to:

 Anarky (Arrowverse), a fictional character in the television series Arrow 
 Anarky (comic book), a short-lived comic book series
 Batman: Anarky, a 1999 trade paperback

See also
 Anarchy (disambiguation)